Brian Joseph Morrison (14 July 1938 – 23 December 2020) was an Australian rules footballer who played with Richmond in the Victorian Football League (VFL).

Family
His grandson, Harry Morrison, plays for Hawthorn in the Australian Football League.

Football
Recruited from Avenel Football Club, where he had played from 1956 to 1959, in 1960, he only played with Richmond for a single season, before returning to Euroa where he worked as a sheep shearer.

He played in six First XVIII matches, and in seven Second XVIII matches as a centreman.

According to Hogan (1996, p.153) he was captain-coach of the Violet Town Football Club in 1964.

Shearer
He won the Australian Open Shearing title twice — in 1967 and 1968 — and, on 11 February 1972, at the RSL Hall in Euroa, Victoria, he set an Australian record by shearing 410 sheep in a day (i.e., under eight hours).

He was inducted into the Shearers Hall of Fame in 2019.

Notes

References
 Hogan P: The Tigers Of Old, Richmond FC, (Melbourne), 1996.

External links 

Australian rules footballers from Victoria (Australia)
Richmond Football Club players
Sheep shearers
1938 births

2020 deaths